Holmavatnet is a lake the Setesdalsheiene mountains of Southern Norway. It is located on the border of the municipalities of Suldal (in Rogaland county), Vinje (in Vestfold og Telemark county), and a small part in Bykle (in Agder county). The southeastern corner of the lake is in Bykle, and it is the northernmost part of all of Aust-Agder county.

See also
List of lakes in Aust-Agder
List of lakes in Norway

References

Lakes of Agder
Lakes of Rogaland
Lakes of Vestfold og Telemark
Suldal
Vinje
Bykle